The concept of T-shaped skills, or T-shaped persons is a metaphor used in job recruitment to describe the abilities of persons in the workforce. The vertical bar on the letter T represents the depth of related skills and expertise in a single field, whereas the horizontal bar is the ability to collaborate across disciplines with experts in other areas and to apply knowledge in areas of expertise other than one's own.

The earliest popular reference is by David Guest in 1991. Tim Brown, CEO of the IDEO design consultancy, endorsed this approach to résumé assessment as a method to build interdisciplinary work teams for creative processes.  Earlier references can be found; in the 1980s the term "T-shaped man" was used internally by McKinsey & Company for recruiting and developing consultants and partners, both male and female.

The term T-shaped skills is also common in the agile software development world and refers to the need for cross-skilled developers and testers in an agile team, e.g. a scrum team.

Also known as
 Versatilist
 Generalizing specialist
 Technical craftsperson
 Renaissance developer
 Master generalist

Skills of various shapes
Other shapes have also been proposed:
 X-shaped for leadership
 I-shaped for individual depth-skill without communication skills
 tree-shaped for a person with depth in many areas or branches of a field
 Multiple Mountains shaped (coined by Forrest Z. Shooster) for individuals with depth in overlapping several fields rather than a shallow depth in many or a singular depth in one field who specialize in the overlap between those fields

Γ- and Μ-shaped individuals (gamma and mu, respectively) have been described by Brittany Fiore in her ethnographic work of data science research communities to indicate people with supporting strengths in computationally- and software-intensive fields.

Similarly, π-shaped skills (after the Greek letter pi) refer to "a broad mastery of general management skills atop a few spikes of deep functional or domain expertise".

See also
Recruitment
Full stack developers are expected to work in all the subsystems.

References

External links
 T-shaped
 Want to plan campaigns? Best get your 'I's crossed
 An Interview with IDEO CEO Tim Brown
 T-shaped professionals, T-shaped skills, hybrid managers 
 International Society of Service Innovation Professionals (ISSIP) co-sponsored T-Summit 
T-Shaped Innovators: Identifying the Right Talent to Support Service Innovation
 T-shaped Learning for the New Technologist, NEF White Paper 2012 (now STEM Foundation)

Human resource management